The 1500 metres speed skating event was part of the speed skating at the 1928 Winter Olympics programme. The competition was held on Tuesday, 14 February 1928. Thirty speed skaters from 14 nations competed.

Medalists

Records
These were the standing world and Olympic records (in minutes) prior to the 1928 Winter Olympics.

(*) The record was set in a high altitude venue (more than 1000 metres above sea level) and on naturally frozen ice.

Results

References

External links
Official Olympic Report
 

Speed skating at the 1928 Winter Olympics